Cher (born Cherilyn Sarkisian; May 20, 1946) is an American singer, actress and television personality. Often referred to by the media as the "Goddess of Pop", she has been described as embodying female autonomy in a male-dominated industry. Cher is known for her distinctive contralto singing voice and for having worked in numerous areas of entertainment, as well as adopting a variety of styles and appearances throughout her six-decade-long career. Cher gained popularity in 1965 as one half of the folk rock husband-wife duo Sonny & Cher after their song "I Got You Babe" peaked at number one on the US and UK charts. Together they sold 40 million records worldwide. Her solo career was established during the same time, with the top-ten singles "Bang Bang (My Baby Shot Me Down)" and "You Better Sit Down Kids". She became a television personality in the 1970s with her CBS shows; first The Sonny & Cher Comedy Hour, watched by over 30 million viewers weekly during its three-year run, and then the namesake Cher. She emerged as a fashion trendsetter by wearing elaborate outfits on her television shows. While working on television, Cher released the US Billboard Hot 100 number-one singles "Gypsys, Tramps & Thieves", "Half-Breed", and "Dark Lady", becoming the female artist with the most number-one singles in United States history at the time. After her divorce from Sonny Bono in 1975, she released the disco album Take Me Home (1979) and earned $300,000 a week for her 1979–1982 concert residency in Las Vegas.

In 1982, Cher made her Broadway debut in the play Come Back to the 5 & Dime, Jimmy Dean, Jimmy Dean and starred in its film adaptation. She subsequently garnered critical acclaim for her performances in films such as Silkwood (1983), Mask (1985), The Witches of Eastwick (1987), and Moonstruck (1987), the last of which won her the Academy Award for Best Actress. She then revived her music career by recording the rock-inflected albums Cher (1987), Heart of Stone (1989), and Love Hurts (1991), all of which yielded successful singles such as "I Found Someone", "If I Could Turn Back Time", and "Love and Understanding". Cher contributed to the soundtrack for her next film, Mermaids (1990), which spawned the UK number-one single "The Shoop Shoop Song (It's in His Kiss)". She made her directorial debut with a segment in the abortion-themed anthology If These Walls Could Talk (1996).

Cher reached a new commercial peak in 1998 with the dance-pop album Believe, whose title track topped the Billboard Year-End Hot 100 singles of 1999 and became the biggest-selling single of all time by a female artist in the UK. It features pioneering use of Auto-Tune to distort her vocals, known as the "Cher effect". Her 2002–2005 Living Proof: The Farewell Tour became one of the highest-grossing concert tours of all time, earning $250 million. In 2008, she signed a $60 million deal to headline the Colosseum at Caesars Palace in Las Vegas for three years. During the 2010s, she landed starring roles in the films Burlesque (2010) and Mamma Mia! Here We Go Again (2018) and released studio albums Closer to the Truth (2013) and Dancing Queen (2018), both of which debuted at number three on the Billboard 200.

Having sold 100 million records, Cher is one of the world's best-selling music artists. Her achievements include a Grammy Award, an Emmy Award, an Academy Award, three Golden Globe Awards, a Cannes Film Festival award, the Billboard Icon Award, and awards from the Kennedy Center Honors and the Council of Fashion Designers of America. She is the only artist to date to have a number-one single on a Billboard chart in six consecutive decades, from the 1960s to the 2010s. Aside from music and acting, she is noted for her political views, social media presence, philanthropic endeavors, and social activism, including LGBT rights and HIV/AIDS prevention.

Life and career

1946–1961: Early life 

Cher was born Cherilyn Sarkisian in El Centro, California, on May 20, 1946. Her father, John Sarkisian, was an Armenian-American truck driver with drug and gambling problems; her mother, Georgia Holt (born Jackie Jean Crouch), was a former model and retired actress who claimed Irish, English, German, and Cherokee ancestry. However, there is no evidence for her being part-Cherokee. Cher's father was rarely home when she was an infant, and her parents divorced when Cher was ten months old. Her mother later married actor John Southall, with whom she had another daughter, Georganne, Cher's half-sister.

Now living in Los Angeles, Cher's mother began acting while working as a waitress. She changed her name to Georgia Holt and played minor roles in films and on television. Holt also secured acting parts for her daughters as extras on television shows like The Adventures of Ozzie and Harriet. Her mother's relationship with Southall ended when Cher was nine years old, but she considers him her father and remembers him as a "good-natured man who turned belligerent when he drank too much". Holt remarried and divorced several more times, and she moved her family around the country (including New York, Texas, and California). They often had little money, and Cher recounted having had to use rubber bands to hold her shoes together. At one point, her mother left Cher at an orphanage for several weeks. Although they met every day, both found the experience traumatic.

When Cher was in fifth grade, she produced a performance of the musical Oklahoma! for her teacher and class. She organized a group of girls, directing and choreographing their dance routines. Unable to convince boys to participate, she acted the male roles and sang their songs. By age nine, she had developed an unusually low voice. Fascinated by film stars, Cher's role model was Audrey Hepburn, particularly due to her role in the 1961 film Breakfast at Tiffany's. Cher began to take after the unconventional outfits and behavior of Hepburn's character. She was also inspired by Marlene Dietrich, Bette Davis, and Katharine Hepburn. She was disappointed by the absence of dark-haired Hollywood actresses whom she could emulate. She had wanted to be famous since childhood but felt unattractive and untalented, later commenting, "I couldn't think of anything that I could do ... I didn't think I'd be a singer or dancer. I just thought, well, I'll be famous. That was my goal."

In 1961, Holt married bank manager Gilbert LaPiere, who adopted Cher (under the name Cheryl LaPiere) and Georganne, and enrolled them at Montclair College Preparatory School, a private school in Encino, whose students were mostly from affluent families. The school's upper-class environment presented a challenge for Cher; biographer Connie Berman wrote, "[she] stood out from the others in both her striking appearance and outgoing personality." A former classmate commented, "I'll never forget seeing Cher for the first time. She was so special ... She was like a movie star, right then and there ... She said she was going to be a movie star and we knew she would." Despite not being an excellent student, Cher was intelligent and creative, according to Berman. She earned high grades, excelling in French and English classes. As an adult, she discovered that she had dyslexia. Cher's unconventional behavior stood out: she performed songs for students during the lunch hours and surprised peers when she wore a midriff-baring top. She later recalled, "I was never really in school. I was always thinking about when I was grown up and famous."

1962–1965: Solo career breakthrough 
At age 16, Cher dropped out of school, left her mother's house, and moved to Los Angeles with a friend. She took acting classes and worked to support herself, dancing in small clubs along Hollywood's Sunset Strip and introducing herself to performers, managers, and agents. According to Berman, "[Cher] did not hesitate to approach anyone she thought could help her get a break, make a new contact, or get an audition." Cher met performer Sonny Bono in November 1962 when he was working for record producer Phil Spector. Cher's friend moved out, and Cher accepted Sonny's offer to be his housekeeper. Sonny introduced Cher to Spector, who used her as a backup singer on many recordings, including the Ronettes' "Be My Baby" and the Righteous Brothers' "You've Lost That Lovin' Feelin'". Spector produced her first single, "Ringo, I Love You", which Cher recorded under the name Bonnie Jo Mason. The song was rejected by many radio stations programmers as they thought Cher's deep contralto vocals were a man's vocals; therefore, they believed it was a male homosexual singing a love song dedicated to the Beatles drummer Ringo Starr.

Cher and Sonny became close friends, eventual lovers, and performed their own unofficial wedding ceremony in a hotel room in Tijuana, Mexico, on October 27, 1964. Although Sonny had wanted to launch Cher as a solo artist, she encouraged him to perform with her because she suffered from stage fright, and he began joining her onstage, singing the harmonies. Cher disguised her nervousness by looking at Sonny; she later commented that she sang to the people through him. In late 1964, they emerged as a duo called Caesar & Cleo, releasing the poorly received singles "Do You Wanna Dance?", "Love Is Strange", and "Let the Good Times Roll".

Cher signed with Liberty Records' Imperial imprint in the end of 1964, and Sonny became her producer. The single "Dream Baby", released under the name "Cherilyn", received airplay in Los Angeles. Imperial encouraged Cher to work with Sonny on her second solo single for the label, a cover version of Bob Dylan's "All I Really Want to Do". It peaked at number 15 on the US Billboard Hot 100 in 1965. Meanwhile, the Byrds had released their own version of the same song. When competition on the singles charts started between Cher and the Byrds, the group's record label began to promote the B-side of the Byrds' single. Roger McGuinn of the Byrds commented, "We loved the Cher version ... We didn't want to hassle. So we just turned our record over." Cher's debut album, All I Really Want to Do (1965), reached number 16 on the Billboard 200; it was later described by AllMusic's Tim Sendra as "one of the stronger folk-pop records of the era".

1965–1967: Sonny and Cher's rise to pop stardom 

In early 1965, Caesar and Cleo began calling themselves Sonny & Cher. Following the recording of "I Got You Babe", they traveled to England in July 1965 at the Rolling Stones' advice; Cher recalled, "[they] had told us ... that Americans just didn't get us and that if we were going to make it big, we were going to have to go to England." According to writer Cintra Wilson, "English newspaper photographers showed up when S&C were thrown out of the London Hilton [because of their outfits] the night they arrived—literally overnight, they were stars. London went gaga for the heretofore-unseen S&C look, which was neither mod nor rocker."

"I Got You Babe" reached number one on the Billboard Hot 100 chart and became, according to AllMusic's Bruce Eder, "one of the biggest-selling and most beloved pop/rock hits of the mid-'60s"; Rolling Stone listed it among "The 500 Greatest Songs of All Time" in 2003. As the song knocked the Beatles off the top of the British charts, English teenagers began to emulate Sonny and Cher's fashion style, such as bell-bottoms, striped pants, ruffled shirts, industrial zippers and fur vests. Upon their return to the US, the duo made several appearances on the teen-pop showcases Hullabaloo and Shindig! and completed a tour of some of the largest arenas in the US. Their shows attracted Cher look-alikes—"girls who were ironing their hair straight and dyeing it black, to go with their vests and bell-bottoms". Cher expanded her creative range by designing a clothing line.

Sonny and Cher's first album, Look at Us (1965), released for the Atco Records division of Atlantic Records, spent eight weeks at number two on the Billboard 200, behind the Beatles' Help!. Their material became popular, and the duo successfully competed with the dominant British Invasion and Motown sounds of the era. Author Joseph Murrells described Sonny and Cher as "part of the leading exponents of the rock-folk-message type of song, a hybrid combining the best and instrumentation of rock music with folk lyric and often lyrics of protest." Sonny and Cher charted ten Billboard top 40 singles between 1965 and 1972, including five top-ten singles: "I Got You Babe", "Baby Don't Go", "The Beat Goes On", "All I Ever Need Is You", and "A Cowboy's Work Is Never Done". At one point, they had five songs in the top 50 at the same time, a feat equaled only by the Beatles and Elvis Presley. Together they sold 40 million records worldwide and had become, according to Time magazine's Ginia Bellafante, rock's "it" couple.

Cher's following releases kept her solo career fully competitive with her work with Sonny. The Sonny Side of Chér (1966) features "Bang Bang (My Baby Shot Me Down)", which reached number two in the US and number three in the UK and became her first million-seller solo single. Chér, also released in 1966, contains the Burt Bacharach and Hal David composition "Alfie", which was added to the credits of the American version of the 1966 film of the same name and became the first stateside version of the popular song. With Love, Chér (1967) includes songs described by biographer Mark Bego as "little soap-opera stories set to rock music" such as the US top-ten single "You Better Sit Down Kids".

1967–1970: Backlash from the younger generation, first marriage 

By the end of the 1960s, Sonny and Cher's music had ceased to chart. According to Berman, "the heavy, loud sound of groups like Jefferson Airplane and Cream made the folk-rock music of Sonny and Cher seem too bland." Cher later said, "I loved the new sound of Led Zeppelin, Eric Clapton, the electric-guitar oriented bands. Left to myself, I would have changed with the times because the music really turned me on. But [Sonny] didn't like it—and that was that." Their monogamous lifestyle during the period of the sexual revolution and the anti-drug position they adopted at the height of the drug culture lost them popularity among American youths. According to Bego, "in spite of their revolutionary unisex clothes, Sonny and Cher were quite 'square' when it came to sex and drugs." In an attempt to recapture their young audience, the duo produced and starred in the film Good Times (1967), which was commercially unsuccessful.

Cher's next album, Backstage (1968), in which she explores diverse musical genres including Brazilian jazz and anti-war protest settings, was not a commercial success. In 1969, she was dropped from Imperial Records while Sonny and Cher had been dropped from Atco; however, the label wanted to sign Cher for a solo album. 3614 Jackson Highway (1969) was recorded without the guidance of Sonny and incorporates experiments in rhythm and blues and soul music. AllMusic's Mark Deming proclaimed it "arguably the finest album of her career", and still "a revelation" decades later. Displeased with the 3614 Jackson Highway album, Sonny prevented Cher from releasing more recordings for Atco.

Meanwhile, Sonny dated others, and by the end of the 1960s their relationship had begun to unravel. According to People magazine, "[Sonny] tried desperately to win her back, telling her he wanted to marry and start a family." They officially married after she gave birth on March 4, 1969, to Chaz Bono.

The duo spent $500,000 and mortgaged their home to make the film Chastity (1969). Written and produced by Sonny, who did not appear in the movie, it tells the story of a young woman, played by Cher, searching for the meaning of life. The art film failed commercially, putting the couple $190,000 in debt with back taxes. However, some critics noted that Cher showed signs of acting potential; Cue magazine wrote, "Cher has a marvelous quality that often makes you forget the lines you are hearing."

At the lowest point of their career, the duo put together a nightclub routine that relied on a more adult approach to sound and style. According to writer Cintra Wilson, "Their lounge act was so depressing, people started heckling them. Then Cher started heckling back. Sonny ... reprimanded her; then she'd heckle Sonny". The heckling became a highlight of the act and attracted viewers. Television executives took note, and the couple began making guest appearances on prime-time shows, in which they presented a "new, sophisticated, and mature" image. Cher adopted alluring, low-cut gowns that became her signature outfits.

1971–1974: Television career breakthrough, first musical comeback 

CBS head of programming Fred Silverman offered Sonny and Cher their own television program after he noticed them as guest-hosts on The Merv Griffin Show in 1971. The Sonny & Cher Comedy Hour premiered as a summer replacement series on August 1, 1971, and had six episodes. Because it was a ratings success, the couple returned that December with a full-time show.

Watched by more than 30 million viewers weekly during its three-year run, The Sonny & Cher Comedy Hour was praised for the comedic timing, and deadpan Cher mocked Sonny about his looks and short stature. According to Berman, they "exuded an aura of warmth, playfulness, and caring that only enhanced their appeal. Viewers were further enchanted when a young [Chaz] also appeared on the show. They seemed like a perfect family." Cher honed her acting skills in sketch comedy roles such as the brash housewife Laverne, the sardonic waitress Rosa, and historical vamps, including Cleopatra and Miss Sadie Thompson. The Bob Mackie-designed clothing Cher wore was part of the show's attraction, and her style influenced the fashion trends of the 1970s.

In 1971, Sonny and Cher signed with the Kapp Records division of MCA Records, and Cher released the single "Classified 1A", in which she sings from the point of view of a soldier who bleeds to death in Vietnam. Written by Sonny, who felt that her first solo single on the label had to be poignant and topical, the song was rejected by radio station programmers as uncommercial.

Since Sonny's first attempts at reviving their recording career as a duo had also been unsuccessful, Kapp Records recruited Snuff Garrett to work with them. He produced Cher's second US number-one single, "Gypsys, Tramps & Thieves", which "proved that ... Garrett knew more about Cher's voice and her persona as a singer than Sonny did", writes Bego. "Gypsys, Tramps & Thieves" was the first single by a solo artist to rank number one on the US Billboard Hot 100 chart at the same time as on the Canadian Singles Chart. Billboard called it "one of the 20th century's greatest songs". It was featured on the 1971 album Chér (eventually reissued under the title Gypsys, Tramps & Thieves), which was certified gold by the Recording Industry Association of America (RIAA). Its second single, "The Way of Love", reached number seven on the Billboard Hot 100 chart and established Cher's more confident image as a recording artist.

In 1972, Cher released the all-ballad set Foxy Lady, demonstrating the evolution of her vocal abilities, according to Bego. Following the release of the album, Garrett quit as producer after disagreeing with Sonny about the kind of material Cher should record. At Sonny's insistence, in 1973 Cher released an album of standards called Bittersweet White Light, which was commercially unsuccessful. That year, lyricist Mary Dean brought Garrett "Half-Breed", a song about the daughter of a Cherokee mother and a white father, that she had written especially for Cher. Although Garrett did not have Cher as a client at the time, he was convinced that "it's a smash for Cher and for nobody else", so he held the song for months until he got Cher back. "Half-Breed" was featured on the album of the same name and became Cher's third US number-one single. Both the album and the single were certified gold by the RIAA.

In 1974, Cher released the song "Dark Lady" as the lead single from the namesake album. It reached the top position on the Billboard Hot 100, becoming Cher's fourth number-one single and making her the female artist with the most number-one singles in United States history at the time. Later that year, she released a Greatest Hits album that, according to Billboard magazine, proved her to be "one of the most consistent hitmakers of the past five years", as well as a "proven superstar who always sells records".

Between 1971 and 1973, Sonny and Cher's recording career was revived with four albums released under Kapp Records and MCA Records: Sonny & Cher Live (1971), All I Ever Need Is You (1972), Mama Was a Rock and Roll Singer, Papa Used to Write All Her Songs (1973), and Live in Las Vegas Vol. 2 (1973). Cher later commented on this period: "I could do a whole album ... in three days ... We were on the road ... and we were doing the Sonny & Cher Show".

1974–1979: Divorce from Sonny Bono, second marriage, decline in popularity 

Cher and Sonny had had marital problems since late 1972, but appearances were maintained until 1974. "The public still thinks we are married," Sonny wrote in his diary at the time, "[and] that's the way it has to be." In February 1974, Sonny filed for a separation, citing "irreconcilable differences". A week later, Cher countered with a divorce suit and charged Sonny with "involuntary servitude", claiming that he withheld money from her and deprived her of her rightful share of their earnings. The couple battled in court over finances and the custody of Chaz, which was eventually granted to Cher. Their divorce was finalized on June 26, 1975.

In 1974, Cher won the Golden Globe Award for Best Actress – Television Series Musical or Comedy for The Sonny & Cher Comedy Hour. The same year, Sonny premiered a solo show on ABC, The Sonny Comedy Revue, which carried the creative team behind the Sonny and Cher show. It was canceled after 13 weeks.

During the divorce proceedings, Cher had a two-year romantic relationship with record executive David Geffen, who freed her from her business arrangement with Sonny, under which she was required to work exclusively for Cher Enterprises, the company he ran. Geffen secured a $2.5 million deal for Cher with Warner Bros. Records, and she began work on her first album under that label in 1975. According to Bego, "it was their intention that [this album] was going to make millions of fans around the world take her seriously as a rock star, and not just a pop singer."

Despite Cher's efforts to develop her musical range by listening to artists such as Stevie Wonder, Elton John, James Taylor, Carly Simon, Joni Mitchell, and Bob Dylan, the resulting album Stars was commercially and critically unsuccessful. Janet Maslin of The Village Voice wrote, "Cher is just no rock and roller ... Image, not music, is Cher Bono's main ingredient for both records and TV." The album has since become a cult classic and is generally considered among her best work.

On February 16, 1975, Cher returned to television with a solo show on CBS. Called Cher, it began as a highly rated special with guests Flip Wilson, Elton John, and Bette Midler. The show was produced by Geffen and centered on Cher's songs, monologs, comedy performance, and her variation of clothing, which was the largest for a weekly TV show. Early critical reception was favorable; the Los Angeles Times exclaimed that "Sonny without Cher was a disaster. Cher without Sonny, on the other hand, could be the best thing that's happened to weekly television this season." Cher lasted for less than a year, replaced by a new show in which she professionally reunited with ex-husband Sonny; she said, "doing a show alone was more than I could handle." According to The Ringer Lindsay Zoladz, "[Cher] found the network censors to be more watchful than they were when she was married to Sonny ... When she was single or casually dating, Cher always seemed to pose more of a threat to the status quo than she did when she was Sonny's wife."

On June 30, 1975, four days after finalizing her divorce from Sonny, Cher married rock musician Gregg Allman, co-founder of The Allman Brothers Band. She filed for divorce nine days later because of his heroin and liquor problems, but they reconciled within a month. They had one son, Elijah Blue, on July 10, 1976. Sonny and Cher's TV reunion, The Sonny and Cher Show, debuted on CBS in February 1976—the first show ever to star a divorced couple. Although the show was a ratings success on its premiere, Cher and Sonny's insulting onscreen banter about their divorce, her reportedly extravagant lifestyle, and her troubled relationship with Allman caused a public backlash that eventually contributed to the show's cancellation in August 1977.

In 1976, Mego Toys released a line of toys and dolls in the likeness of Sonny and Cher, which coincided with the popularity of The Sonny and Cher Show. The miniature version of Cher ended up being the highest selling doll of 1976, surpassing Barbie.

Cher's next albums, I'd Rather Believe in You (1976) and Cherished (1977), the latter a return to her pop style at Warner's producers' insistence, were commercially unsuccessful; Orange Coast magazine's Keith Tuber commented, "A weekly television series ... can spell disaster for a recording artist ... Regular exposure on TV allowed people to see and hear these performers without having to buy their records ... That's what happened to Cher[.]" In 1977, under the rubric "Allman and Woman", she recorded alongside Allman the duet album Two the Hard Way. Their relationship ended following the release of the album, and their divorce was finalized in 1979. Beginning in 1978, she had a two-year live-in relationship with Kiss member Gene Simmons. That year, she legally changed her name from Cherilyn Sarkisian La Piere Bono Allman to Cher, to eliminate the use of four surnames. She returned to prime time television with the ABC specials Cher... Special (1978)—featuring a 15-minute segment in which she performs all of the roles in her version of West Side Story— and Cher... And Other Fantasies (1979).

1979–1982: Second musical comeback, shift from disco music to rock 

A single mother with two children, Cher realized that she had to make a choice about the direction of her singing career. Deciding to temporarily abandon her desire to be a rock singer, she signed with Casablanca Records and launched a comeback with the single "Take Me Home" and the album of the same name, both of which capitalized on the disco craze. Both the album and the single became instant successes, remained bestsellers for more than half of 1979, and were certified gold by the RIAA. Sales of the album may have been boosted by the image of a scantily clad Cher in a Viking outfit on its cover. Despite her initial lack of enthusiasm for disco music, she changed her mind after the success, commenting, "I never thought I would want to do disco ... [but] it's terrific! It's great music to dance to. I think that danceable music is what everybody wants."

Encouraged by the popularity of Take Me Home, Cher planned to return to rock music in her next album, Prisoner (1979). The album's cover features Cher draped in chains as a "prisoner of the press", which caused controversy among feminist groups for her perceived portrayal of a sex slave. She included rock songs, which made the disco release seem unfocused and led to its commercial failure. Prisoner produced the single "Hell on Wheels", featured on the soundtrack of the film Roller Boogie. The song exploits the late 1970s roller-skating fad and contributed to its popularity.

In 1980, alongside Italian record producer Giorgio Moroder, Cher wrote her last Casablanca disco recording, "Bad Love", for the film Foxes. She formed the rock band Black Rose that year with her then-lover, guitarist Les Dudek. Although Cher was the lead singer, she did not receive top billing because she wanted to create the impression that all band members were equal. Since she was easily recognized when she performed with the band, she developed a punk look by cutting her trademark long hair. Despite appearances on television, the band failed to earn concert dates. Their album Black Rose received unfavorable reviews; Cher told Rolling Stone, "The critics panned us, and they didn't attack the record. They attacked me. It was like, 'How dare Cher sing rock & roll?'"

Black Rose disbanded in 1981. During Black Rose's active period, Cher was simultaneously doing a residency show at Caesars Palace in Las Vegas, earning $300,000 a week. Titled Cher in Concert, the three-year performance residency opened in June 1979 and eventually became Cher's first world concert tour as a solo artist (also referred to as the Take Me Home Tour), with additional dates in North America, Europe, South Africa, and Australia. It yielded two television specials: Standing Room Only: Cher in Concert (1981) and Cher... A Celebration at Caesars (1983), the latter of which won Cher the CableACE Award for Best Actress in a Variety Program.

In 1981, Cher released a duet with musician Meat Loaf called "Dead Ringer for Love", which reached number five on the UK Singles Chart and was later described by AllMusic's Donald A. Guarisco as "one of the more inspired rock duets of the 1980s". In 1982, Columbia Records released the album I Paralyze, later deemed by Bego as Cher's "strongest and most consistent solo album in years" despite its low sales.

1982–1986: Film career breakthrough, musical hiatus 

With decreasing album sales and a lack of commercially successful singles, Cher decided to further develop her acting career. While she had previously aspired to venture into film, she had only the critically and commercially unsuccessful movies Good Times and Chastity to her credit, and the Hollywood establishment did not take her seriously as an actress. Cher later recalled, "I was making a fortune on the road, but I was dying inside. Everyone kept saying, 'Cher, there are people who would give anything to have standing room only at Caesars Palace. It would be the pinnacle of their careers.' And I kept thinking, 'Yes, I should be satisfied' ... But I wasn't satisfied." She moved to New York in 1982 to take acting lessons with Lee Strasberg, founder of the Actors Studio, but never enrolled after her plans changed. She auditioned for and was signed by director Robert Altman for the Broadway stage production Come Back to the 5 & Dime, Jimmy Dean, Jimmy Dean, playing a member of a James Dean fan club holding a 20-year reunion. That year, Altman cast her again in the film adaptation of the same title.

Director Mike Nichols, who had seen Cher onstage in Jimmy Dean, offered her the part of Dolly Pelliker, a plant co-worker and Meryl Streep's lesbian roommate in the film Silkwood. When it premiered in 1983, audiences questioned Cher's ability as an actress. She recalls attending a film preview during which the audience laughed when they saw her name in the credits. For her performance, Cher received a nomination for the Academy Award for Best Supporting Actress and won the Golden Globe Award for Best Supporting Actress – Motion Picture.

In 1985, Cher formed the film production company Isis. Her next film, Mask (1985), reached number two at the box office and was Cher's first critical and commercial success as a leading actress. For her role as a drug addict biker with a teenage son who has a severe physical deformity, she won the Cannes Film Festival Award for Best Actress. During the making of the film, however, she clashed with director Peter Bogdanovich, and was ultimately omitted from the Oscar nomination list. She attended the 58th Academy Awards in a tarantula-like costume, later deemed by Vanity Fair Esther Zuckerman as Cher's "Oscar revenge dress". "As you can see, I did receive my Academy booklet on how to dress like a serious actress," Cher declared before presenting the nominees for Best Supporting Actor. The incident garnered her much publicity.

Cher's May 1986 guest appearance on talk show Late Night with David Letterman, during which she called Letterman "an asshole", attracted much media coverage; Letterman later recalled, "It did hurt my feelings. Cher was one of the few people I've really wanted to have on the show ... I felt like a total fool, especially since I say all kinds of things to people." She returned to the show in 1987, reuniting with Sonny for the last time before his death to sing an impromptu version of "I Got You Babe". According to Rolling Stone Andy Greene, "they weren't exactly the best of friends at this point, but both of them knew it would make for unforgettable television. Had YouTube existed back then, this would have gone insanely viral the next morning." Rolling Stone listed the performance among "David Letterman's Top 10 Musical Moments" in 2015.

1987–1992: Film stardom, third musical comeback 

Cher starred in three films in 1987. In Suspect, she played a public defender who is both helped and romanced by one of the jurors in the homicide case she is handling. Alongside Susan Sarandon and Michelle Pfeiffer, she starred as one of three divorcees involved with a mysterious and wealthy visitor from hell who comes to a small New England town in the comedy horror The Witches of Eastwick. In Norman Jewison's romantic comedy Moonstruck, she played an Italian widow in love with her fiancé's younger brother. The two last films ranked among the top ten highest-grossing films of 1987, at number ten and five, respectively.

The New York Times Janet Maslin wrote Moonstruck "offers further proof that Cher has evolved into the kind of larger-than-life movie star who's worth watching whatever she does." For that film, Cher won the Academy Award for Best Actress and the Golden Globe Award for Best Actress – Motion Picture Comedy or Musical. By 1988, Cher had become one of the most bankable actresses of the decade, commanding $1 million per film. That year, she released the fragrance Uninhibited, which earned about $15 million in its first year sales.

In 1987, Cher signed with Geffen Records and revived her musical career with what music critics Johnny Danza and Dean Ferguson describe as "her most impressive string of hits to date", establishing her as a "serious rock and roller ... a crown that she'd worked long and hard to capture". Michael Bolton, Jon Bon Jovi, Desmond Child, and Richie Sambora produced her first Geffen album, Cher. Despite facing strong retail and radio airplay resistance upon its release, the album proved to be a commercial success, certified platinum by the RIAA. Cher features the rock ballad "I Found Someone", Cher's first US top-ten single in more than eight years.

By the end of the 1980s, Cher was also receiving attention for her controversial lifestyle, including her tattoos, plastic surgeries, exhibitionist fashion sense, and affairs with younger men. She had romantic relationships with actors Val Kilmer, Eric Stoltz, and Tom Cruise, hockey player Ron Duguay, film producer Josh Donen, Bon Jovi guitarist Richie Sambora, and Rob Camilletti, a bagel baker 18-years her junior whom she dated from 1986 to 1989.

Cher's 19th studio album Heart of Stone (1989) was certified triple platinum by the RIAA. The music video for its second single, "If I Could Turn Back Time", caused controversy due to Cher's performance on the battleship , straddling a cannon, and wearing a leather thong that revealed her tattooed buttocks. The song topped the Australian charts for seven weeks, reached number three on the Billboard Hot 100 chart and became one of Cher's most successful singles. Other songs from Heart of Stone to reach the US top ten were "After All", a duet with Peter Cetera, and "Just Like Jesse James". At the 1989 People's Choice Awards, Cher won the Favorite All-Around Female Star Award. She embarked on the Heart of Stone Tour in 1989. Most critics liked the tour's nostalgic nature and admired Cher's showmanship. Its parent television special Cher at the Mirage (1991) was filmed during a concert in Las Vegas.

In her first film in three years, Mermaids (1990), Cher paid tribute to her own mother in this story about a woman who moves her two daughters from town to town at the end of a love affair. She clashed with the film's first two directors, Lasse Hallström and Frank Oz, who were replaced by Richard Benjamin. Believing Cher would be the star attraction, the producers allowed her creative control for the film. Mermaids was a box office success and received generally positive reviews. One of the two songs Cher recorded for the film's soundtrack, a cover version of Betty Everett's "The Shoop Shoop Song (It's in His Kiss)", topped the UK Singles Chart for five weeks.

Cher's final studio album for Geffen Records, Love Hurts (1991), stayed at number one in the UK for six weeks and produced the UK top-ten single "Love and Understanding". The album was certified gold by the RIAA. In later years, Cher commented that her Geffen label "hit years" had been especially significant to her, "because I was getting to do songs that I really loved ... songs that really represented me, and they were popular!" She released the exercise book Forever Fit in 1991, followed by the 1992 fitness videos CherFitness: A New Attitude and CherFitness: Body Confidence. She embarked on the Love Hurts Tour during 1992. That year, the UK-only compilation album Greatest Hits: 1965–1992 peaked at number one in the country for seven weeks. It features three new songs: "Oh No Not My Baby", "Whenever You're Near", and "Many Rivers to Cross".

1992–1997: Health and professional struggles, directorial debut 

Partially due to her experiences filming Mermaids, Cher turned down leading roles in such films as The War of the Roses and Thelma & Louise. According to Berman, "After the success of Moonstruck, she was so worried about her next career move that she was overly cautious." In the early 1990s, she contracted the Epstein–Barr virus and developed chronic fatigue syndrome, which left her too exhausted to sustain her music and film careers. Because she needed to earn money and was not healthy enough to work on other projects, she starred in infomercials launching health, beauty, and diet products, which earned her close to $10 million in fees. The skits were parodied on Saturday Night Live and critics considered them a sellout, many suggesting her film career was over. She told Ladies' Home Journal, "Suddenly I became the Infomercial Queen and it didn't occur to me that people would focus on that and strip me of all my other things."

Cher made cameo appearances in the Robert Altman films The Player (1992) and Prêt-à-Porter (1994). In 1994, she started a mail-order catalog business, Sanctuary, selling Gothic-themed products, and contributed a rock version of "I Got You Babe" to MTV's animated series Beavis and Butt-head. Alongside Chrissie Hynde, Neneh Cherry, and Eric Clapton, she topped the UK Singles Chart in 1995 with the charity single "Love Can Build a Bridge". Later that year, she signed with Warner Music UK's label WEA and released the album It's a Man's World (1995), which came out of her idea of covering men's songs from a woman's point of view. In general, critics favored the album and its R&B influences, some saying her voice had improved. Stephen Holden of The New York Times wrote that "From an artistic standpoint, this soulful collection of grown-up pop songs ... is the high point of her recording career." It's a Man's World reached number 10 on the UK Albums Chart and spawned the UK top-ten single "One by One". Tracks were remixed for the American release of the album, abandoning its original rock sound in favor of a style more accessible to US radio. The US release failed commercially, reaching number 64 on the Billboard 200.

In 1996, Cher played the wife of a businessman who hires a hitman to murder her in the Chazz Palminteri-scripted dark comedy film Faithful. Although the film received negative reviews from critics, Cher was praised for her role; The New York Times Janet Maslin wrote that she "does her game best to find comic potential in a victim's role." Cher refused to promote the film, claiming it was "horrible". She made her directorial debut with a segment in the abortion-themed anthology If These Walls Could Talk (1996), in which she starred as a doctor murdered by an anti-abortion fanatic. It drew the highest ratings for an original HBO movie to date, registering an 18.7 rating with a 25 share in HBO homes and attracting 6.9 million viewers. Her music played a large role in the American TV series The X-Files episode "The Post-Modern Prometheus", which aired in November 1997. Written for her, it tells the story of a scientist's grotesque creature who adores Cher because of her role in Mask, in which her character cares for her disfigured son.

1998–1999: Death of Sonny Bono, fourth musical comeback 
Following Sonny Bono's death in a skiing accident in 1998, Cher delivered a tearful eulogy at his funeral, calling him "the most unforgettable character" she had met. She paid tribute to him by hosting the CBS special Sonny & Me: Cher Remembers, which aired on May 20, 1998. That month, Sonny and Cher received a star on the Hollywood Walk of Fame for Television. Later that year, Cher published The First Time, a collection of autobiographical essays of "first-time" events in her life, which critics praised as down-to-earth and genuine. Although the manuscript was almost finished when Sonny died, she could not decide whether to include his death in the book; she feared being criticized for capitalizing on the event. She told Rolling Stone, "I couldn't ignore it, could I? I might have if I cared more about what people think than what I know is right for me."

Cher's 22nd studio album Believe (1998) marked a musical departure for her, as it comprises dance-pop songs, many of which capture the "disco-era essence"; Cher said, "It's not that I think this is a '70s album ... but there's a thread, a consistency running through it that I love.'" Believe was certified quadruple platinum by the RIAA and went on to be certified gold or platinum in 39 countries, selling 10 million copies worldwide. The album's title track reached number one in more than 23 countries and sold over 10 million copies worldwide. It became the bestselling recording of 1998 and 1999, respectively, in the UK and the US, and Cher's most successful single to date. "Believe" topped the UK Singles Chart for seven weeks and became the biggest-selling single of all time by a female artist in the UK, selling over 1.84 million copies in the country up until October 2018. It also topped the Billboard Hot 100 chart for four weeks, selling over 1.8 million units in the US up until December 1999. The song earned Cher the Grammy Award for Best Dance Recording and the 1999 Billboard Music Award for Hot 100 Single of the Year.

On January 31, 1999, Cher performed "The Star-Spangled Banner" at the Super Bowl XXXIII. Two months later, she sang on the television special VH1 Divas Live 2, which attracted 19.4 million viewers. According to VH1, it was the most popular, and most watched program in the television network's history, as Cher's presence was "a huge part of making it exactly that." The Do You Believe? tour ran from 1999 to 2000 and was sold out in every American city in which it was booked, amassing a global audience of more than 1.5 million. Its companion television special, Cher: Live in Concert – From the MGM Grand in Las Vegas (1999), was the highest rated original HBO program in 1998–99, registering a 9.0 rating among adults 18 to 49 and a 13.0 rating in the HBO universe of about 33 million homes. Capitalizing on the success of "Believe", Cher's former record company Geffen Records released in April 1999 the US-only compilation album If I Could Turn Back Time: Cher's Greatest Hits, which features the previously unreleased song "Don't Come Cryin' to Me". It was certified gold by the RIAA. Seven months later, Cher released the compilation album The Greatest Hits, which sold three million copies outside of the US up until January 2000.

Cher was named the number-one dance artist of 1999 by Billboard. At the 1999 World Music Awards, she received the Legend Award for her "lifelong contribution to the music industry". Her next film, Franco Zeffirelli's Tea with Mussolini (1999), received generally positive reviews, and she earned critical acclaim for her performance as a rich, flamboyant American socialite whose visit to Italy is not welcome among the Englishwomen; one reviewer from Film Comment wrote, "It is only after she appears that you realize how sorely she's been missed from movie screens! For Cher is a star. That is, she manages the movie star trick of being at once a character and at the same time never allowing you to forget: that's Cher."

2000–2009: Touring success, retirement, Vegas residency 
Not Commercial (2000) was written mostly by Cher after she had attended a songwriters' conference in 1994; it marked her first attempt at writing most of the tracks for an album. As the album was rejected by her record label for being uncommercial, she chose to sell it only on her website. In the song "Sisters of Mercy", she criticized as "cruel, heartless and wicked" the nuns who prevented her mother from retrieving her from a Catholic orphanage in Scranton, PA. The Catholic church denounced the song.

Cher's highly anticipated dance-oriented follow-up to Believe, Living Proof (2001), entered the Billboard 200 at number nine and was certified gold by the RIAA. The album includes the UK top-ten single "The Music's No Good Without You" and "Song for the Lonely", the latter song dedicated to "the courageous people of New York" following the September 11 attacks. In May 2002, she performed during the benefit concert VH1 Divas Las Vegas. At the 2002 Billboard Music Awards, she won the Dance/Club Play Artist of the Year Award and was presented with the Artist Achievement Award by Steven Tyler for having "helped redefine popular music with massive success on the Billboard charts". That year, her wealth was estimated at $600 million.

In June 2002, Cher embarked on the Living Proof: The Farewell Tour, announced as the final live concert tour of her career, although she vowed to continue making records and films. The show highlighted her successes in music, television, and film, featuring video clips from the 1960s onwards and an elaborate backdrop and stage set-up.

Initially scheduled for 49 shows, the worldwide tour was extended several times. By October 2003, it had become the most successful tour ever by a woman, grossing $145 million from 200 shows and playing to 2.2 million fans. Forbes named Cher the highest-paid female musician of 2003, earning $33.1 million. A collection of live tracks taken from the tour was released in 2003 as the album Live! The Farewell Tour. The NBC special Cher – The Farewell Tour (2003) attracted 17 million viewers. It was the highest rated network-TV concert special of 2003 and earned Cher the Primetime Emmy Award for Outstanding Variety, Music, or Comedy Special.

After leaving Warner UK in 2002, Cher signed a worldwide deal with the US division of Warner Bros. Records in September 2003. The Very Best of Cher (2003), a greatest-hits collection that surveys her entire career, peaked at number four on the Billboard 200 and was certified double platinum by the RIAA. She played herself in the Farrelly brothers comedy Stuck on You (2003), mocking her public image as she appears in bed with a much younger boyfriend.

Cher's 326-date Farewell Tour ended in 2005 as one of the highest-grossing concert tours of all time, seen by over 3.5 million people and earning $250 million. After three years of retirement, she began in 2008 a three-year, 200-performance residency at the Colosseum at Caesars Palace, Las Vegas, for which she earned a reported $60 million. Titled Cher, the production featured state-of-the-art video and special effects, elaborate set designs, 14 dancers, four aerialists and more than 20 costume changes.

2010–2017: Burlesque, return to music and touring 

In Burlesque (2010), Cher's first musical film since 1967's Good Times, the actress plays a nightclub impresario whom a young Hollywood hopeful is looking to impress. One of the two songs she recorded for the film's soundtrack, the power ballad "You Haven't Seen the Last of Me", reached number one on the Billboard Dance Club Songs chart in January 2011, making Cher the only artist to date to have a number-one single on a Billboard chart in six consecutive decades, from the 1960s to the 2010s. In November 2010, she received the honor of placing her handprints and footprints in cement in the courtyard in front of Grauman's Chinese Theatre in Hollywood. The next year, she lent her voice to Janet the Lioness in the comedy Zookeeper. Dear Mom, Love Cher, a documentary she produced about her mother Georgia Holt, aired on Lifetime in May 2013.

Closer to the Truth, Cher's 25th studio album and the first since 2001's Living Proof, entered the Billboard 200 at number three in October 2013, her highest position on that chart to date. Michael Andor Brodeur of The Boston Globe commented that "Cher's 'Goddess of Pop' sash remains in little danger of undue snatching; at 67, she sounds more convincing than J-Lo or Madonna reporting from 'the club'". Cher premiered the lead single "Woman's World" on the season four finale of the talent show The Voice, her first live TV performance in over a decade. She later joined the show's season five as judge Blake Shelton's team adviser.

On June 30, 2013, Cher headlined the annual Dance on the Pier benefit, celebrating Gay Pride day. It became the event's first sellout in five years. In November 2013, she appeared as a guest performer and judge on the seventeenth season of ABC's Dancing with the Stars, during its eighth week, which was dedicated to her. She embarked on the Dressed to Kill Tour in March 2014, nearly a decade after announcing her "farewell tour". She quipped about that fact during the shows, saying this would actually be her last farewell tour while crossing fingers. The tour's first leg, which included 49 sold-out shows in North America, grossed $54.9 million. In November 2014, she canceled all remaining dates due to an infection that affected kidney function.

On May 7, 2014, Cher confirmed a collaboration with American hip hop group Wu-Tang Clan on their album Once Upon a Time in Shaolin. Credited as Bonnie Jo Mason, she uses an alias of hers originated in 1964. Only one copy of the album has been produced, and it was sold by online auction in November 2015. It is the most expensive single album ever sold. After appearing as Marc Jacobs' guest at the 2015 Met Gala, Cher posed for his brand's fall/winter advertising campaign. The fashion designer stated, "This has been a dream of mine for a very, very long time."

Classic Cher, a three-year concert residency at both the Park Theater at Monte Carlo Resort and Casino, Las Vegas, and The Theater at MGM National Harbor, Washington, opened in February 2017. At the 2017 Billboard Music Awards, Cher performed "Believe" and "If I Could Turn Back Time", her first awards show performance in more than 15 years, and was presented with the Billboard Icon Award by Gwen Stefani, who called her "a role model for showing us how to be strong and true to ourselves [and] the definition of the word Icon."

2018–present: Return to film, Dancing Queen, upcoming projects 

In 2018, Cher returned to film for the romantic musical comedy film Mamma Mia! Here We Go Again. New York magazine's Viviana Olen and Matt Harkins commented that "it's only at the climax of the movie when its true promise is fulfilled: Cher arrives ... It becomes clear that every single movie—no matter how flawless—would be infinitely better if it included Cher." She stars as Ruby Sheridan, who is the grandmother of Sophie, played by Amanda Seyfried, and the mother of Donna, portrayed by Meryl Streep. Cher recorded two ABBA songs for the film's soundtrack: "Fernando" and "Super Trouper". Björn Ulvaeus of ABBA commented, "She makes Fernando her own. It's her song now."

On March 4, 2018, Cher headlined the 40th Sydney Gay and Lesbian Mardi Gras. Tickets sold out within three hours after she hinted her performance on her Twitter account. In September 2018, Cher embarked on the Here We Go Again Tour.

While promoting Mamma Mia! Here We Go Again, Cher confirmed she was working on an album that would feature cover versions of songs from ABBA. The album, Dancing Queen, was released on September 28, 2018. Brittany Spanos from Rolling Stone commented that "the 72-year-old makes ABBA songs not only sound like they should've been written for her in the first place but like they firmly belong in 2018". Marc Snetiker from Entertainment Weekly called it Cher's "most significant release since 1998's Believe" and noted that "the album ender, 'One of Us', is frankly one of Cher's best recordings in years." Dancing Queen debuted at number three on the Billboard 200, tying with 2013's Closer to the Truth for Cher's highest-charting solo album in the US. With first-week sales of 153,000 units, it earned the year's biggest sales week for a pop album by a female artist, as well as Cher's largest sales week since 1991. Dancing Queen also topped Billboards Top Album Sales chart, making it Cher's first number-one album on that chart.

The Cher Show, a jukebox musical based on Cher's life and music, officially premiered at the Oriental Theatre in Chicago, on June 28, 2018, and played through July 15. It began Broadway previews November 1, with its official opening on December 3, 2018. Written by Rick Elice, it features three actresses playing Cher during different stages of her life. The Cher Show is set to launch a UK and Ireland tour in 2022.

On December 2, 2018, Cher received a Kennedy Center Honors prize, the annual Washington distinction for artists who have made extraordinary contributions to culture. The ceremony featured tribute performances by Cyndi Lauper, Little Big Town and Adam Lambert. During 2018, Cher used Twitter to announce she was working on four new projects for the next two years: a Christmas album; a second album of ABBA covers; an autobiography; and a biographical film about her life.

In October 2019, Cher launched a new perfume, Cher Eau de Couture, which was four years in the making. Described as "genderless", it is Cher's second fragrance after 1987's Uninhibited. On February 4, 2020, Cher was announced as the new face of fashion brand Dsquared2. She starred in the brand's spring/summer advertising campaign, which was directed by photographers Mert and Marcus. In May, Cher released her first Spanish-language song, a cover of ABBA's "Chiquitita". Proceeds from the single were donated to UNICEF following the COVID-19 pandemic. In November, Cher spawned a UK top-ten single as part of the charity supergroup BBC Radio 2 Allstars with "Stop Crying Your Heart Out", an Oasis cover recorded in support of BBC's Children in Need charity.

Cher appeared in a voice-over role as a bobblehead version of herself in the animated feature film Bobbleheads: The Movie (2020). The same year, she was featured on The New York Times Magazines list of "The Best Actors of 2020", the first time an actor not in a current-year theatrical release made it on the annual list; film critics Wesley Morris and A. O. Scott commented, "Cher's radiant performance in Moonstruck warmed us in quarantine." In May 2021, Cher guest-starred as God in Pink's music video "All I Know So Far". In January 2022, Cher appeared as the star of MAC Cosmetics' "Challenge Accepted" campaign alongside rapper Saweetie. In June 2022, Cher partnered with Donatella Versace for an exclusive "Chersace" capsule collection in honor of Pride month. A portion of the proceeds was donated to Gender Spectrum, a charity which works with LGBTQIA+ children and young people.

Artistry

Music and voice 

Cher has employed various musical styles, including folk rock, pop rock, power ballads, disco, new wave music, rock music, punk rock, arena rock, and hip hop; she said she has done this to "remain relevant and do work that strikes a chord". Her music has mainly dealt with themes of heartbreak, independence, and self-empowerment for women; by doing so, she became "a brokenhearted symbol of a strong but decidedly single woman", according to Out magazine's Judy Wieder. Goldmine magazine's Phill Marder credited Cher's "nearly flawless" song selection as what made her a notorious rock singer; while several of her early songs were penned by or sung with Sonny Bono, most of her solo successes, which outnumbered Sonny and Cher's successes, were composed by independent songwriters, selected by Cher. Not Commercial (2000), Cher's first album mostly written by herself, presents a "1970s singer-songwriter feel" that proves "Cher adept in the role of storyteller", according to AllMusic's Jose F. Promis.

Robert Hilburn of the Los Angeles Times writes, "There were a lot of great records by female singers in the early days of rock ... None, however, reflected the authority and command that we associate with rock 'n' roll today as much as [Cher's] key early hits". Some of Cher's early songs discuss subjects rarely addressed in American popular music such as divorce, prostitution, unplanned and underaged pregnancy, and racism. According to AllMusic's Joe Viglione, the 1972 single "The Way of Love" is "either about a woman expressing her love for another woman, or a woman saying au revoir to a gay male she loved" ("What will you do/When he sets you free/Just the way that you/Said good-bye to me"). Her ability to carry both male and female ranges allowed her to sing solo in androgynous and gender-neutral songs.

Cher has a contralto singing voice, described by author Nicholas E. Tawa as "bold, deep, and with a spacious vibrato". Ann Powers of The New York Times called it "a quintessential rock voice: impure, quirky, a fine vehicle for projecting personality." AllMusic's Bruce Eder wrote that the "tremendous intensity and passion" of Cher's vocals coupled with her "ability to meld that projection with her acting skills" can provide "an incredibly powerful experience for the listener." The Guardian Laura Snapes described her voice as "miraculous ... capable of conveying vulnerability, vengeance and pain all at once". Paul Simpson, in his book The Rough Guide to Cult Pop (2003), posits that "Cher [is] the possessor of one of the huskiest, most distinctive voices in pop ... which can work wonders with the right material directed by the right producer". He further addresses the believability of her vocal performances: "she spits out the words ... with such conviction you'd think she was delivering an eternal truth about the human condition".

Writing about Cher's musical output during the 1960s, Robert Hilburn of the Los Angeles Times stated that "Rock was subsequently blessed with the staggering blues exclamations of Janis Joplin in the late '60s and the raw poetic force of Patti Smith in the mid-'70s. Yet no one matched the pure, seductive wallop of Cher". By contrast, her vocal performances during the 1970s were described by Eder as "dramatic, highly intense ... [and] almost as much 'acted' as sung". First heard in the 1980 record Black Rose, Cher employed sharper, more aggressive vocals on her hard rock-oriented albums, establishing her sexually confident image. For the 1995 album It's a Man's World, she restrained her vocals, singing in higher registers and without vibrato.

The 1998 song "Believe" has an electronic vocal effect proposed by Cher, and was the first commercial recording to feature Auto-Tune—an audio processor originally intended to disguise or correct off-key inaccuracies in vocal music recordings—as a deliberate creative effect. According to Rolling Stone Christopher R. Weingarten, the "producers ... used the pitch correction software not as a way to fix mistakes in Cher's iconic voice, but as an aesthetic tool." After the success of the song, the technique became known as the "Cher effect" and has since been widely used in popular music. Cher continued to use Auto-Tune on the albums Living Proof (2001), Closer to the Truth (2013), and Dancing Queen (2018).

In a 2013 interview with the Toronto Sun, Cher reflected on how her voice has evolved throughout her career, becoming stronger and suppler over the years. She said working with vocal coaches had made a significant difference: "It's so freaky because people my age are having to lose notes and I'm gaining notes, so that's pretty shocking."

Films, videos, and stage 

Maclean's magazine's Barbara Wickens wrote, "Cher has emerged as probably the most fascinating movie star of her generation ... [because] she has managed to be at once boldly shocking and ultimately enigmatic." New York Post movie critic David Edelstein attributes Cher's "top-ranking star quality" to her ability of projecting "honesty, rawness and emotionality. She wears her vulnerability on her sleeve." Jeff Yarbrough of The Advocate wrote that Cher was "one of the first superstars to 'play gay' with compassion and without a hint of stereotyping", as she portrays a lesbian in the 1983 film Silkwood.

Author Yvonne Tasker, in her book Working Girls: Gender and Sexuality in Popular Cinema (2002), notes that Cher's film roles often mirrors her public image as a rebellious, sexually autonomous, and self-made woman. In her films, she recurrently serves as a social intermediary to disenfranchised male characters, such as Eric Stoltz's Craniodiaphyseal dysplasia character in Mask (1985), Liam Neeson's mute homeless veteran in Suspect (1987), and Nicolas Cage's socially isolated baker with a wooden hand in Moonstruck (1987). Film critic Kathleen Rowe wrote of Moonstruck that the depiction of Cher's character as "a 'woman on top' [is] enhanced by the unruly star persona Cher brings to the part'".

For Moonstruck, Cher was ranked 1st on Billboards list of "The 100 Best Acting Performances by Musicians in Movies", and her performance was described as "the standard by which you mentally check all others". Moonstruck was acknowledged by the American Film Institute as the eighth best romantic comedy film of all time.

Cher's public image is also reflected in her music videos and live performances, in which she "repeatedly comments on her own construction, on her search for perfection and on the performance of the female body", wrote Tasker. Unlike other acts of that time, who often featured female backers mimicking the singer's performance, Cher uses a male dancer dressed as her in the 1992 concert video Cher at the Mirage; author Diane Negra commented, "In authorizing her own quotation, Cher acknowledges herself as fictionalized production, and proffers to her audience a pleasurable plurality." James Sullivan of the San Francisco Chronicle wrote that "Cher is well aware that her chameleonic glitz set the stage for the current era of stadium-size razzle-dazzle. She's comfortable enough to see such imitation as flattery, not theft." American singer Pink, who is recognized by her acrobatic stage presence, started studying Aerial silks after watching Cher's Living Proof: The Farewell Tour in 2004.

Cher was ranked 17th on VH1's list of the "50 Greatest Women of the Video Era". The 1980 video for "Hell on Wheels" involves cinematic techniques and was one of the first music videos ever. Deemed "controversial" for her performance on the battleship , straddling a cannon, and wearing a leather thong that revealed her tattooed buttocks, the 1989 music video for "If I Could Turn Back Time" was the first ever to be banned by MTV.

Public image

Fashion

Time magazine's Cady Lang described Cher as a "cultural phenomenon [who] has forever changed the way we see celebrity fashion." Cher emerged as a fashion trendsetter in the 1960s, popularizing "hippie fashion with bell-bottoms, bandanas, and Cherokee-inspired tunics". She began working as a model in 1967 for photographer Richard Avedon after then-Vogue magazine editor Diana Vreeland discovered her at a party for Jacqueline Kennedy that year. Avedon took the controversial photo of Cher in a beaded and feathered nude gown designed by Bob Mackie for the cover of Time magazine in 1975; Billboard magazine's Brooke Mazurek described it as "one of the most recreated and monumental looks of all time." Cher first wore the gown to the 1974 Met Gala. According to Vogue magazine's André Leon Talley, "it was really the first time a Hollywood celebrity attended, and it changed everything. We are still seeing versions of that look on The Met red carpet 40 years later." Billboard wrote that Cher has "transformed fashion and [become] one of the most influential style icons in red carpet history".

Through her 1970s television shows, Cher became a sex symbol with her inventive and revealing Mackie-designed outfits, and fought the network censors to bare her navel. Although Cher has been erroneously attributed to being the first woman to expose her navel on television (e.g. Nichelle Nichols, BarBara Luna and Diana Ewing in the 1960s TV series Star Trek), she was the most prominent to do so since the establishment of the American Code of Practices for Television Broadcasters in 1951, which prompted network censors to ban navel exposure on US television. People dubbed Cher the "pioneer of the belly beautiful". In 1972, after she was featured on the annual "Best Dressed Women" lists, Mackie stated: "There hasn't been a girl like Cher since Dietrich and Garbo. She's a high-fashion star who appeals to people of all ages."

In May 1999, after the Council of Fashion Designers of America recognized Cher with an award for her influence on fashion, Robin Givhan of the Los Angeles Times called her a "fashion visionary" for "striking just the right note of contemporary wretched excess". Givhan referenced Tom Ford, Anna Sui and Dolce & Gabbana as "[i]nfluential designers [who] have evoked her name as a source of inspiration and guidance." She concluded that "Cher's Native American showgirl sexpot persona now seems to epitomize the fashion industry's rush to celebrate ethnicity, adornment and sex appeal." Vogue proclaimed Cher "[their] favorite fashion trendsetter" and wrote that "[she] set the grounds for pop stars and celebrities today", describing her as "[e]ternally relevant [and] the ruler of outré reinvention". Alexander Fury of The Independent lauded Cher as "the ultimate fashion icon" and traced her influence among female celebrities such as Beyoncé, Jennifer Lopez, and Kim Kardashian, stating that "[t]hey all graduated from the Cher school of never sharing the stage, with anyone, or anything ... They're trying to share the spotlight, to have Cher's success."

Physical appearance

Cher has attracted media attention for her physical appearance—particularly her youthful looks and her tattoos. Paddy Calistro of the Los Angeles Times observed that during Cher's rise as a movie star in the 1980s, her "highly articulated bone structure captured audience attention", which led to an increased number of medical requests for "surgically inserted 'cheekbones.'" Journalists have often called Cher the "poster girl" of plastic surgery. Author Grant McCracken, in his book Transformations: Identity Construction in Contemporary Culture (2008), draws a parallel between Cher's plastic surgeries and the transformations in her career: "Her plastic surgery is not merely cosmetic. It is hyperbolic, extreme, over the top ... Cher has engaged in a transformational technology that is dramatic and irreversible." Caroline Ramazanoglu, author of Up Against Foucault: Explorations of Some Tensions Between Foucault and Feminism (1993), wrote that "Cher's operations have gradually replaced a strong, decidedly 'ethnic' look with a more symmetrical, delicate, 'conventional' ... and ever-youthful version of female beauty ... Her normalised image ... now acts as a standard against which other women will measure, judge, discipline and 'correct' themselves."

Cher has six tattoos. The Baltimore Sun called her the "Ms. Original Rose Tattoo". She got her first tattoo in 1972. According to Sonny Bono, "Calling her butterfly tattoos nothing was like ignoring a sandstorm in the Mojave. That was exactly the effect Cher wanted to create. She liked to do things for the shock they created. She still does. She'll create some controversy and then tell her critics to stick it." In the late 1990s, she began having laser treatments to remove her tattoos. The process was still underway in the 2000s. She commented, "When I got tattooed, only bad girls did it: me and Janis Joplin and biker chicks. Now it doesn't mean anything. No one's surprised."

In 1992, Madame Tussauds wax museum honored Cher as one of the five "most beautiful women of history" by creating a life-size statue. She was ranked 26th on VH1's list of the "100 Sexiest Artists" published in 2002.

Cher was the inspiration for Mother Gothel, a fictional character who appears in Walt Disney Pictures' animated feature film Tangled (2010). Director Byron Howard explained that Gothel's exotic appearance, whose beauty, dark curly hair and voluptuous figure were deliberately designed to serve as a foil to Rapunzel's, was based on Cher's "exotic and Gothic looking" appearance, continuing that the singer "definitely was one of the people we looked at visually, as far as what gives you a striking character."

Social media
Cher's social media presence has drawn analysis from journalists. Time named her "Twitter's most outspoken (and beloved) commentator". The New York Times writer Jenna Wortham commended Cher on her social media usage, stating, "Most celebrities' social-media feeds feel painfully self-aware and thirsty ... In her own way, Cher is an outlier, perhaps the last unreconstructed high-profile Twitter user to stand at her digital pulpit and yell (somewhat) incomprehensibly, and be rewarded for it. Online, authenticity and originality are often carefully curated myths. Cher thrives on a version of nakedness and honesty that is rarely celebrated in the public eye." Monica Heisey of The Guardian described Cher's Twitter account as "a jewel in the bizarro crown of the internet", and remarked, "While many celebrities use Twitter for carefully crafted self-promotion, Cher just lets it all hang out."

As a gay icon
The reverence held for Cher by members of the LGBT community has been attributed to her career accomplishments, her sense of style, and her longevity. Cher is considered a gay icon, and has often been imitated by drag queens. According to Salon magazine's Thomas Rogers, "[d]rag queens imitate women like Judy Garland, Dolly Parton and Cher because they overcame insult and hardship on their path to success, and because their narratives mirror the pain that many gay men suffer on their way out of the closet". According to Maclean's magazine's Elio Iannacci, Cher was "one of the first to bring drag to the masses" as she hired two drag queens to perform with her at her Las Vegas residency in 1979. Cher's role as a lesbian in the film Silkwood, as well as her transition to dance music and social activism, have further contributed to her becoming a gay icon. The NBC sitcom Will & Grace acknowledged Cher's status by making her the idol of gay character Jack McFarland. Cher guest-starred as herself twice on the show, in 2000—making the episode "Gypsies, Tramps and Weed" (named after her 1971 song "Gypsys, Tramps & Thieves") Will & Graces second-highest rating ever— and 2002.

Other interests

Philanthropy 
Cher's primary philanthropic endeavors have included support of health research and patients' quality of life, anti-poverty initiatives, veterans rights, and vulnerable children. The Cher Charitable Foundation supports international projects such as the Intrepid Fallen Heroes Fund, Operation Helmet, and the Children's Craniofacial Association.

Children
Beginning in 1990, Cher served as a donor and as the National Chairperson and Honorary Spokesperson for the Children's Craniofacial Association, whose mission is to "empower and give hope to facially disfigured children and their families". The annual Cher's Family Retreat is held each June to provide craniofacial patients, their siblings and parents an opportunity to interact with others who have endured similar experiences. She supports and promotes Get A-Head Charitable Trust, which aims to improve the quality of life for people with head and neck diseases.

Cher is a donor, fundraiser, and international spokesperson for Keep a Child Alive, an organization that seeks to accelerate action to combat the AIDS pandemic, including the provision of antiretroviral medicine to children and their families with HIV/AIDS. In 1996, she hosted the American Foundation for AIDS Research (amfAR) Benefit alongside Elizabeth Taylor at the Cannes Film Festival. In 2015, she received the amfAR Award of Inspiration for "her willingness and ability to use her fame for the greater good" and for being "one of the great champions in the fight against AIDS".

In 2007, Cher became the primary supporter of the Peace Village School (PVS) in Ukunda, Kenya, which "provides nutritious food, medical care, education and extracurricular activities for more than 300 orphans and vulnerable children, ages 2 to 13 years." Her support enabled the school to acquire land and build permanent housing and school facilities, and in partnership with Malaria No More and other organizations, she piloted an effort to eliminate malaria mortality and morbidity for the children, their caregivers and the surrounding community.

Soldiers and veterans
Cher has been a vocal supporter of American soldiers and returning veterans. She has contributed resources to Operation Helmet, an organization that provides free helmet upgrade kits to troops in Iraq and Afghanistan. She has contributed to the Intrepid Fallen Heroes Fund, which serves military personnel who have been disabled in operations in Iraq and Afghanistan, and those severely injured in other operations. In 1993, she participated in a humanitarian effort in Armenia, taking food and medical supplies to the war-torn region.

Poverty
Cher has engaged in the construction of houses with Habitat for Humanity and served as the Honorary National Chair of a Habitat's elimination of poverty housing initiative "Raise the Roof", an effort to engage artists in the organization's work while on tour.

Environment
In 2016, after the discovery of lead contamination in the drinking water of Flint, Michigan, Cher donated more than 180,000 bottles of water to the city as part of a partnership with Icelandic Glacial.

Elder rights
In 2017, Cher weighed in on the need to protect elder rights as she executive produced Edith+Eddie, a documentary about a nonagenarian interracial couple. It received a nomination for the Academy Award for Best Documentary (Short Subject).

COVID-19
Following the COVID-19 outbreak in 2020, Cher launched the CherCares Pandemic Resource and Response Initiative (CCPRRI) alongside Dr. Irwin Redlener, the head of Columbia University's Pandemic Resource and Response Center. The charity's initial plan is to distribute $1 million to "chronically neglected and forgotten people" during the pandemic through the Entertainment Industry Foundation (EIF). Cher told Billboard, "There are rural areas where people of color and Latinos and Native Americans were getting no services. It's not a lot of money — $1 million goes in the blink of an eyelash! — so now I'm trying to get my friends to make it a lot more so we can do something that will really meet people's needs. A friend once told me, 'When people walk in your path, then you know what you have to do.'"

Animal rights
In November 2020, Cher joined Four Paws International and traveled to Pakistan to advocate for and work with the country's government to have Kaavan, an elephant who had been confined to a zoo for 35 years, transferred to a wildlife sanctuary in Cambodia. In April 2021, Paramount+ released the documentary film Cher and the Loneliest Elephant, detailing Cher's quest, alongside animal aid groups and veterinarians, to free Kaavan from confinement.

LGBT rights
Cher's older child, Chaz Bono, first came out as a lesbian at age 17, which reportedly caused Cher to feel "guilt, fear and pain". However, she soon came to accept Chaz's sexual orientation, and came to the conclusion that LGBT people "didn't have the same rights as everyone else, [and she] thought that was unfair". She was the keynote speaker for the 1997 national Parents, Families, & Friends of Lesbians and Gays (PFLAG) convention, and has since become one of the LGBT community's most vocal advocates. In May 1998, she received the GLAAD Vanguard Award for having "made a significant difference in promoting equal rights for lesbians and gay men". On June 11, 2009, Chaz came out as a transgender man, and his transition from female to male was legally finalized on May 6, 2010.

Politics 

Cher has said that she is not a registered Democrat, but has attended many Democratic conventions and events. Over the years, Cher's political views have attracted media attention, and she has been an outspoken critic of the conservative movement. In an interview with Vanity Fair, she was critical of a variety of political topics, including Republican politicians like Sarah Palin and Jan Brewer. She has commented that she did not understand why anyone would be a Republican because eight years under the administration of George W. Bush "almost killed [her]".

During the 2000 United States presidential election, ABC News wrote that she was determined to do "whatever possible to keep him [Bush] out of office". She told the site, "If you're black in this country if you're a woman in this country, if you are any minority in this country at all, what could possibly possess you to vote Republican? ... You won't have one fucking right left." She added, "I don't like Bush. I don't trust him. I don't like his record. He's stupid. He's lazy."

On October 27, 2003, Cher anonymously called a C-SPAN phone-in program to recount a visit she made to maimed soldiers at the Walter Reed Army Medical Center and criticized the lack of media coverage and government attention given to injured servicemen. She remarked that she watches C-SPAN every day. Although she identified herself as an unnamed entertainer, she was recognized by the C-SPAN host, who subsequently questioned her about her 1992 support for independent presidential candidate Ross Perot. She said, "When I heard him talk right in the beginning, I thought that he would bring some sort of common-sense business approach and also less partisanship, but then ... I was completely disappointed like everyone else when he just kind of cut and run and no one knew exactly why ... Maybe he couldn't have withstood all the investigation that goes on now".

On Memorial Day weekend in 2006, Cher called into C-SPAN's Washington Journal endorsing Operation Helmet, a group that provides helmets to help soldiers avoid head injuries while in the war zone. On June 14, 2006, she made a guest appearance on C-SPAN with Dr. Bob Meaders, the founder of Operation Helmet. That year, in an interview with Stars and Stripes, she explained her "against the war in Iraq but for the troops" position: "I don't have to be for this war to support the troops because these men and women do what they think is right. They do what they're told to do. They do it with a really good heart. They do the best they can. They don't ask for anything."

Cher supported Hillary Clinton in her 2008 presidential campaign. After Obama won the Democratic nomination, she supported his candidacy on radio and TV programs. However, in a 2010 interview with Vanity Fair, she commented that she "still thinks Hillary would have done a better job", although she "accepts the fact that Barack Obama inherited insurmountable problems". During the 2012 United States presidential election, Cher and comedian Kathy Griffin released a public service announcement titled "Don't Let Mitt Turn Back Time on Women's Rights". In the PSA, the pair criticized Republican presidential nominee Mitt Romney for his support of Richard Mourdock, the US Senate candidate who suggested that pregnancies resulting from rape were "part of God's plan".

In September 2013, Cher declined an invitation to perform at the 2014 Winter Olympics opening ceremony in Russia due to the country's controversial anti-gay legislation that overshadowed preparations for the event. In June 2015, after Donald Trump announced his candidacy for president, she made a series of critical comments on Twitter, stating that "Donald Trump's punishment is being Donald Trump". In October 2018, after the victory in Brazil's presidential election of right-wing populist Jair Bolsonaro, Cher called him a "pig" and "a politician from hell", before declaring that Bolsonaro should be "locked in prison for the rest of his life".

In September 2020, Cher raised nearly $2 million for Joe Biden's presidential campaign at a virtual, LGBTQ-themed fundraiser. In October, she traveled to Nevada and Arizona to campaign on behalf of Biden, and released a cover version of "Happiness is Just a Thing Called Joe", a song conceived for the 1943 musical film Cabin in the Sky, with lyrics updated to be about Biden. The same month, Cher posted messages on Twitter in support of Armenia and Artsakh regarding the Nagorno-Karabakh war. She stated, "We stand with the people of Armenia [and] urge our leaders in Washington to conduct the sustained and rigorous diplomacy necessary to bring peace to the Artsakh region."

In 2022, after the Russian invasion of Ukraine, she publicly supported Ukraine. In her Twitter account, Cher repeatedly raised the issue of the war in Ukraine, calling for aid to Ukrainians. On March 18, the singer announced that she would shelter Ukrainian refugees in her home. Earlier, on February 23, Cher called Putin a despot who is ready to restore the Soviet Union.

Legacy 
Rolling Stone Rob Sheffield stated how "there are no other careers remotely like hers, [particularly] in the history of pop music" and referred to Cher as "the one-woman embodiment of the whole gaudy story of pop music." According to Goldmine magazine's Phill Marder, Cher "has been and remains today one of the Rock Era's most dominant figures". He described her as the leader of an effort in the 1960s to "advance feminine rebellion in the rock world [and] the prototype of the female rock star, setting the standard for appearance, from her early hippie days to her later outlandish outfits, and her attitude—the perfect female punk long before punk even was a rock term." Billboard Joe Lynch described Cher as "a woman who pioneered an androgynous musical identity in the mid '60s", and who by doing so "teed things up for people like Bowie and Patti Smith".

Billboard Keith Caulfield wrote that "there's divas, and then there's Cher." The New York Times Matthew Schneier stated, "[Cher] has earned her mononym. Her star power is such that she has spored an entire industry of imitators, both figurative and literal." Dazed magazine's Shon Faye elaborates: "If Madonna and Lady Gaga and Kylie and Cyndi Lauper were playing football, Cher would be the stadium they played on, and the sun that shone down on them." According to Jeff Miers from The Buffalo News, "Her music has changed with the times over the decades, rather than changing those times through groundbreaking work"; however, he felt that subsequent female pop singers were heavily inspired by Cher's abilities to combine "showmanship with deep musicality ... to make valid statements in a wide variety of trend-driven idioms ... to ease effortlessly between pop subgenres [and] to shock without alienating her fans", as well as by her charismatic stage presence and the strong LGBT support among her fan base.

Cher is commonly referred to by the media as the "Goddess of Pop". Her work in music, film, television, and fashion has influenced artists including Benjamin Francis Leftwich, Betsy, Beyoncé, Bonnie McKee, Britney Spears, Bruno Mars, Christina Aguilera, Cleo, Cyndi Lauper, Drew Barrymore, Dua Lipa, Gemma Chan, Gwen Stefani, Helena Vondráčková, Jennifer Lopez, Kacey Musgraves, Kanye West, Katy Perry, Lady Gaga,
Lil' Kim, Lizzo, Lucy Dacus, Miley Cyrus, Olivier Rousteing, Paulina Rubio, Pink, Madonna, Marc Jacobs, Ralph, Rihanna, Rita Ora, Rob Halford of Judas Priest, RuPaul, Sarah Paulson, Saweetie, Shania Twain, Shirley Manson of Garbage, 
Sofia Carson,  Taylor Swift, Tina Turner, Tracy Chapman, Troye Sivan, and Zendaya.

Cher has repeatedly reinvented herself through various personas, for which Professor Richard Aquila from Ball State University called her "the ultimate pop chameleon". According to Entertainment Weekly
Marc Snetiker, "Cher has floated through generation after generation, scooping up new fans, thrilling old ones, reinventing her own myth and glittering splendidly through it all." Billboard magazine's Brooke Mazurek credited Cher as having "revolutionized the idea of what a pop star could visually accomplish, the way they could create multiple personas that live on and off-stage." James Reed from The Boston Globe elaborates: "Along with David Bowie, she is one of the original chameleons in pop music, constantly in flux and challenging our perceptions of her[.]" The New York Times declared Cher as the "Queen of the Comeback". According to author Lucy O'Brien, "Cher adheres to the American Dream of reinvention of self: 'Getting old does not have to mean getting obsolete.'"

Author Craig Crawford, in his book The Politics of Life: 25 Rules for Survival in a Brutal and Manipulative World (2007), describes Cher as "a model of flexible career management", and relates her career successes to a constant reshaping of her image according to the evolving trends of popular culture. He further explains that she billed "each dramatic turnaround of style as another example of rebellion—an image that allowed her to make calculated changes while appearing to be consistent." Author Grant McCracken stated, "The term 'reinvention' is now often used to talk about the careers of American celebrities. But in Cher's case, it is particularly apt [because she] is inclined to lock on to each new fashion wave [and] is swept violently down the diffusion stream and out of fashion. Only substantial re-creation permits her to return to stardom." Her "integrity" and "perseverance" are highlighted in the Reaching Your Goals book series of illustrated inspirational stories for children, in which her life is detailed emphasizing the importance of self-actualization: "For years, Cher worked hard to become a successful singer. Then she worked hard to become an actress. Even when she needed money, she turned down movie roles that weren't right for her. Her goal has always been to be a good actress, not just a rich and famous one."

Cher's "ability to forge an immensely successful and lengthy career as a woman in a male-dominated entertainment world" has drawn attention from feminist critics. According to author Diane Negra, Cher was presented in the beginning of her career as a product of male creativity; Cher remembers, "It was a time when girl singers were patted on the head for being good and told not to think". However, her image eventually changed due to her "refusal of dependence on a man and the determination not only to forge a career (as an actor) on her own terms but to refuse the conventional role assigned to women over forty years old in an industry that fetishises youth", wrote author Yvonne Tasker. She was featured in the 16th-anniversary edition of Ms. magazine as an "authentic feminist hero" and a 1980s role model for women: "Cher, the straightforward, tattooed, dyslexic single mother, the first Oscar winner to have entered into matrimony with a known heroin addict and to have admitted to being a fashion victim by choice, has finally landed in an era that's not afraid to applaud real women."

Stephanie Brush from The New York Times wrote, following the telecast of Cher's Oscar win in 1988, that she "performs the function for women moviegoers that Jack Nicholson has always fulfilled for men. Free of the burden of ever having been America's sweetheart, she is the one who represents us [women] in our revenge fantasies, telling all the fatheads ... exactly where they can go. You need to be more than beautiful to get away with this. You need to have been Cher for 40 years." Cher's 1996 interview for Dateline NBCs Jane Pauley became a viral video in 2016; in it, Cher tells the story of her mother asking her to "settle down and marry a rich man," to which Cher replies, "Mom, I am a rich man." Cher's "Mom, I am a rich man" quote was included in Taylor Swift's 2019 music video "You Need to Calm Down". Bustle magazine's Erica Kam commented, "[Cher's quote] puts a spin on typical gender norms ... It would make sense, then, that Swift would want to follow Cher's example."

Alec Mapa of The Advocate elaborates: "While the rest of us were sleeping, Cher's been out there for the last four decades living out every single one of our childhood fantasies ... Cher embodies an unapologetic freedom and fearlessness that some of us can only aspire to." Rolling Stone Jancee Dunn wrote, "Cher is the coolest woman who ever stood in shoes. Why? Because her motto is, 'I don't give a shit what you think, I'm going to wear this multicolored wig.' There are folks all over America who would, in their heart of hearts, love to date people half their age, get multiple tattoos and wear feathered headdresses. Cher does it for us." Alexander Fury of The Independent wrote that Cher "represents a seemingly immortal, omnipotent, uni-monikered level of fame." Bego stated: "No one in the history of show business has had a career of the magnitude and scope of Cher's. She has been a teenage pop star, a television hostess, a fashion magazine model, a rock star, a pop singer, a Broadway actress, an Academy Award-winning movie star, a disco sensation, and the subject of a mountain of press coverage." Lynch wrote that "the world would certainly be different if she hadn't stayed so irrevocably Cher from the start."

Achievements 

As a solo artist, Cher has sold 100 million records worldwide (in addition to 40 million as part of the duo Sonny & Cher), making her one of the best-selling music artists of all time. She is one of the few artists to win three of the four major American entertainment awards (EGOT—Emmy, Grammy, Oscar, and Tony), and one of five actor-singers to have had a US number-one single and won an acting Academy Award. Her breakthrough single, Sonny & Cher's "I Got You Babe", is a Grammy Hall of Fame inductee and was featured on Rolling Stone "500 Greatest Songs of All Time" list compiled in 2003. Her 1971 single "Gypsys, Tramps & Thieves" was called "one of the 20th century's greatest songs" by Billboard magazine. Her 1998 song "Believe" is the biggest-selling single of all time by a female artist in the UK. It was voted the world's eighth favorite song in a poll conducted by BBC in 2003—the only American song to be named on the list. "Believe" was placed on the 2021 revised list of Rolling Stone "500 Greatest Songs of All Time". In 1988, Cher became the first performer to receive an Academy Award for acting and a RIAA-certified gold album in the same year since the inception of gold awards in 1958.

Cher is the only artist to have a number-one single on a Billboard chart in six consecutive decades, from the 1960s to the 2010s. She has held US Billboard Hot 100 number-one singles over the longest period of time in history: 33 years, seven months and three weeks between "I Got You Babe", which topped the chart for the first time on August 14, 1965, and "Believe", whose last week at number one was April 3, 1999. With "Believe", she became the oldest female artist to have a US number-one song in the rock era, at the age of 52. Billboard ranked her at number 43 on their "Greatest Hot 100 Artists of All Time" list. In 2014, the magazine listed her as the 23rd highest-grossing touring act since 1990, with total earned revenue of $351.6 million and 4.5 million attendance at her shows.

Cher has received numerous honorary awards, including the 1985 Woman of the Year Award by the Hasty Pudding Theatricals society at Harvard University, the Vanguard Award at the 1998 GLAAD Media Awards, the Legend Award at the 1999 World Music Awards, a special award for influence on fashion at the 1999 CFDA Fashion Awards, the Lucy Award for Innovation in Television at the 2000 Women in Film Awards, the Artist Achievement Award at the 2002 Billboard Music Awards, the Lifetime Achievement Award at the 2010 Glamour Awards, the Legend Award at the 2013 Attitude Awards, the Award of Inspiration at the 2015 amfAR Gala, the Icon Award at the 2017 Billboard Music Awards, the 2018 Kennedy Center Honor, the Ambassador for the Arts Award at the 2019 Chita Rivera Awards for Dance and Choreography, and the 2020 Spirit of Katharine Hepburn Award. In 2010, Cher received the honor of placing her handprints and footprints in cement in the courtyard in front of Grauman's Chinese Theatre in Hollywood. Her name is on a star on the Hollywood Walk of Fame as part of the duo Sonny & Cher. She had also been selected for the honor as a solo artist in 1983, but forfeited her opportunity by declining to schedule the mandatory personal appearance.

In 2003, Cher appeared at number 41 on VH1's list of "The 200 Greatest Pop Culture Icons", which recognizes "the folks that have significantly inspired and impacted American society". She was ranked 31st on VH1's list of "The 100 Greatest Women in Music" for the period 1992–2012. Esquire magazine placed her at number 44 on their list of "The 75 Greatest Women of All Time". She was featured on the "100 Greatest Movie Stars of our Time" list compiled by People. In a 2001 poll, Biography magazine ranked her as their third favorite leading actress of all time, behind Audrey Hepburn and Katharine Hepburn.

Discography

Solo studio albums

Collaborative studio albums
 Two the Hard Way (with Gregg Allman as Allman and Woman) (1977)
 Black Rose (as lead vocalist of Black Rose) (1980)

Tours and residencies

Headlining concerts

Collaborative concerts
 Two the Hard Way Tour (with Gregg Allman as Allman and Woman) (1977)
 The Black Rose Show (as lead vocalist of Black Rose) (1980)

Concert residencies
 Cher in Concert (1979–1982)
 Cher (20082011)
 Classic Cher (2017–2020)

Filmography

Films

Headlining television shows and specials

See also 

 Culture of the United States
 Honorific nicknames in popular music
 List of artists who reached number one in the United States
 List of bestselling music artists
 List of highest-grossing concert tours
 Forbes list of highest-earning musicians

References

Sources

External links 

 
 
 
 
 
 
 
 
 

 
1946 births
Living people

Best Actress Academy Award winners
Best Musical or Comedy Actress Golden Globe (film) winners
Best Musical or Comedy Actress Golden Globe (television) winners
Best Supporting Actress Golden Globe (film) winners
Cannes Film Festival Award for Best Actress winners
David di Donatello winners
Grammy Award winners
Grammy Award winners for dance and electronic music
Kennedy Center honorees
Primetime Emmy Award winners
Echo (music award) winners

American contraltos
American dance musicians
American disco musicians
American women pop singers
American women rock singers
American women singer-songwriters
American house musicians
American pop rock singers
Las Vegas shows
Record producers from California
Sonny & Cher
Torch singers
Atco Records artists
Atlantic Records artists
Columbia Records artists
Geffen Records artists
Imperial Records artists
Kapp Records artists
MCA Records artists
Warner Records artists

American film actresses
American television actresses
American voice actresses
Ethnic Armenian actresses

American adoptees
American people of Armenian descent
American people of English descent
American people of French descent
American people of German descent
American people of Irish descent
American people who self-identify as being of Native American descent
People from El Centro, California
Actresses from Malibu, California
American LGBT rights activists
Activists from California
Actresses from Los Angeles
Singers from Los Angeles
20th-century American actresses
21st-century American actresses
20th-century American singers
21st-century American singers
20th-century American women singers
21st-century American women singers
American women record producers
American women in electronic music
Singer-songwriters from California
Actors with dyslexia
Musicians with dyslexia
People with chronic fatigue syndrome